The light of Christ is a concept in Christianity deriving from several passages in the New Testament. One of the main reference points for 'the light of Christ,' is in the prologue of John's Gospel, "That was the true Light, which lighteth every man that cometh into the world" (KJV Bible). Another is the Apostle Paul's citation "Christ will shine on you".

Notable writers on the concept of the light of Christ include Ephrem the Syrian in the fourth century, Severus of Antioch in the sixth century, and the Quaker William Penn.

See also
 Divine light

References

Christian terminology